Chaceus is a genus of crabs in the family Pseudothelphusidae, containing the following species:
 Chaceus caecus Rodriguez & Bosque, 1990
 Chaceus cesarensis Rodriguez & Vilosia, 1992
 Chaceus curumanensis Campos & Valencia, 2004
 Chaceus davidi Campos & Rodriguez, 1984
 Chaceus ibiricensis Campos & Valencia, 2004
 Chaceus motiloni Rodriguez, 1980
 Chaceus nasutus Rodriguez, 1980
 Chaceus pearsei (Rathbun, 1915)
 Chaceus turikensus Rodriguez & Herrera, 1994

The genus' name commemorates Fenner A. Chace Jr.

References

Pseudothelphusidae